is a Japanese track and field athlete. He competed in the men's pole vault at the 1976 Summer Olympics.

References

1951 births
Living people
Place of birth missing (living people)
Japanese male pole vaulters
Olympic male pole vaulters
Olympic athletes of Japan
Athletes (track and field) at the 1976 Summer Olympics
Asian Athletics Championships winners
Japan Championships in Athletics winners